Monumental Island is a Baffin Island offshore island located in the Arctic Archipelago in the territory of Nunavut. The island lies in Davis Strait, almost halfway between Lady Franklin Island and Little Hall Island.

Monumental Island was named by Charles Francis Hall, an  Arctic explorer, as a tribute to the memory of Sir John Franklin.

References

External links
 Photos

Islands of Davis Strait
Uninhabited islands of Qikiqtaaluk Region
Islands of Baffin Island